Benjamin Verbič (born 27 November 1993) is a Slovenian professional footballer who plays as a left winger for Super League Greece club Panathinaikos and the Slovenia national team.

Verbič began his senior career with his hometown club Celje, where he made a total of 126 appearances and scored 35 goals in all competitions. With Celje, he was the runner-up of the Slovenian PrvaLiga in 2014–15, and a three-time runner-up of the Slovenian Football Cup. In 2015 Verbič transferred to Copenhagen, where he won a double of Danish Superliga and Danish Cup in both of his full seasons. In January 2018, he signed for Dynamo Kyiv, with whom he won a league and two cup titles, before temporarily moving to Polish club Legia Warsaw when the war in Ukraine broke out.

Having represented Slovenia at various youth levels, Verbič made his senior debut in March 2015 against Qatar.

Club career

Celje
Born in Celje, Verbič made his Slovenian PrvaLiga debut for hometown club Celje on 29 May 2011 in a 3–2 home defeat to Primorje, replacing Iztok Močivnik for the last 24 minutes in his only appearance of the season.

He made twelve league appearances the following season (eight starts), contributing a first career goal on 3 April 2012, a consolation goal in a 2–1 home defeat against Olimpija Ljubljana. On 23 May 2012, in the 2011–12 Slovenian Football Cup final against already-crowned league winners Maribor, Verbič scored in extra time in a 2–2 draw but missed the first penalty as his team lost in a shoot-out.

Verbič made 26 league appearances for Celje in the 2012–13 season, scoring 3 goals. On 24 August he was loaned to Šampion of the Slovenian Second League, where he made three appearances, two as a starter. Celje again reached the cup final, losing 1–0 to Maribor at Bonifika Stadium in Koper on 29 May 2013, with Verbič playing the entire match. In the quarter-final first leg on 24 October 2012, he scored both of the team's goals to defeat Dravinja, netting in the second minute and in added time.

On 25 October 2014, Verbič scored a first career hat-trick in a 5–0 home win against Radomlje.

Copenhagen
On 27 April 2015, Verbič signed a four-year contract with Copenhagen, to join at the end of the season. He scored two minutes into his debut on 16 July, a 2–0 home win over Newtown of Wales in the UEFA Europa League second qualifying round. His Danish Superliga debut came ten days later, playing the entirety of a 3–1 win at Esbjerg on the first day of the season, and his first league goal on 16 September, opening their 3–0 home win over Randers.

Copenhagen won the Danish Superliga and Danish Cup double in both of Verbič's full seasons. On 17 April 2017, he scored the only goal in a Copenhagen Derby win against Brøndby IF.

Dynamo Kyiv
On 23 December 2017, Verbič signed a five-year contract with the Ukrainian Premier League side Dynamo Kyiv. In 2018 he was recognized a player of the month in the Ukrainian Premier League on three occasions, in May, July, and August 2018.

On 8 July 2020, Verbič scored the equalizing goal in the final of the Ukrainian Cup. He would also convert his penalty kick in the shoot-out, after the match finished 1–1 after extra time, with Dynamo prevailing 8–7 over Vorskla Poltava.

Legia Warsaw
In March 2022, Verbič left Kyiv because of the Russian invasion of Ukraine. His contract with Dynamo was suspended under new FIFA rules, which allowed players to sign with clubs outside Ukraine until 30 June 2022. Therefore, he joined Ekstraklasa side Legia Warsaw for the remainder of the 2021–22 season. On 31 May 2022, he left the club following the expiration of his contract.

Panathinaikos
On 29 July 2022, Verbič signed a three-year deal with Super League Greece club Panathinaikos.

International career
On 30 March 2015, Verbič made his debut for the Slovenia national team, starting in an eventual 1–0 friendly defeat to Qatar at the Jassim Bin Hamad Stadium in Doha. He scored his first international goal on 11 November 2016 in an away win over Malta in the 2018 FIFA World Cup qualification.

Career statistics

Club

International

Scores and results list Slovenia's goal tally first, score column indicates score after each Verbič goal.

Honours
Copenhagen
 Danish Superliga: 2015–16, 2016–17
 Danish Cup: 2015–16, 2016–17

Dynamo Kyiv
Ukrainian Premier League: 2020–21
Ukrainian Cup: 2019–20, 2020–21
Ukrainian Super Cup: 2018, 2019, 2020

References

External links

Player profile at NZS 

 
 

1993 births
Living people
Sportspeople from Celje
Slovenian footballers
Association football wingers
NK Celje players
NK Šampion players
F.C. Copenhagen players
FC Dynamo Kyiv players
Legia Warsaw players
Panathinaikos F.C. players
Slovenian PrvaLiga players
Slovenian Second League players
Danish Superliga players
Ukrainian Premier League players
Ekstraklasa players
Super League Greece players
Slovenia youth international footballers
Slovenia under-21 international footballers
Slovenia international footballers
Slovenian expatriate footballers
Expatriate men's footballers in Denmark
Expatriate footballers in Ukraine
Expatriate footballers in Poland
Expatriate footballers in Greece
Slovenian expatriate sportspeople in Denmark
Slovenian expatriate sportspeople in Ukraine
Slovenian expatriate sportspeople in Poland
Slovenian expatriate sportspeople in Greece